The Slovenian Supercup was a football match played between the Slovenian PrvaLiga champions and the Slovenian Cup winners. Prior 2007, the match was held only twice, in 1995 and 1996. The competition was resurrected in 2007 and was held annually for nine seasons, before it was abolished after the 2015 edition.

Winners

By year

By club

External links
Official website 
Slovenia – List of Super Cup Finals, RSSSF.com

 
Supercup
Slovenia